Imperator Nikolai I was a wooden-hulled, steam-powered, first-rate ship of the line built for the Imperial Russian Navy in the late 1850s. She served as a gunnery training ship and troopship with the Baltic Fleet for a number of years after her completion. The ship was stricken from the Navy List in 1874.

Description, construction and career
The design of Imperator Nikolai I was based on that of the British first-rate ship of the line . The ship displaced  and measured 3,469 tons bm. She was equipped with an imported British Humphrys and Tennant steam engine of 600 nominal horsepower that drove a single propeller shaft. Initially rated as a 124-gun ship of the line, Imperator Nikolai I was rerated while under construction as a 111-gun ship. All of her guns were smoothbores and they consisted of one 60-pounder gun on a pivot mount, twenty 60-pounder guns, 32 long and 26 short 36-pounders and thirty 36-pounder gunnades.

The ship was laid down on 26 June 1855 at the New Admiralty Shipyard in St. Petersburg with the name of Imperator Aleksandr I, but she was renamed on 28 July 1855. Imperator Nikolai I was launched on 18 July 1860 and conducted her sea trials after the installation of her engines and machinery was completed on 1 June 1861. She was considered for conversion to an ironclad in 1862–63, but no work was actually done. Imperator Nikolai I served as a gunnery training ship from 1862 to 1866 with the Baltic Fleet; she also served as a troop transport in 1863–64. The ship was stricken on 26 January 1874.

Notes

Citations

References

Naval ships of Russia
1860 ships
Ships of the line of the Imperial Russian Navy